Vance Parmelly is an American wheelchair tennis player. He represented the United States at the 1996 Summer Paralympics in Atlanta, Georgia, United States.

Parmelly and Stephen Welch won the gold medal in the men's doubles event at the 1996 Summer Paralympics.

He also competed in the men's singles event where he reached the quarterfinals.

References

External links 
 

Living people
Year of birth missing (living people)
Place of birth missing (living people)
Paralympic gold medalists for the United States
Paralympic wheelchair tennis players of the United States
Wheelchair tennis players at the 1996 Summer Paralympics
Paralympic medalists in wheelchair tennis
Medalists at the 1996 Summer Paralympics